The Técély card (TCL card) is the smartcard of TCL, the public transport network in Lyon, France, launched on 1 July 2002. Unlike other smartcards, where a topup amount is required at the start and is deducted each time you make a trip, the TCL card has a €5 fee, and the option to put on either a weekly or monthly pass on top of this. This must be renewed every week or month to ensure you can keep using the card. The card has a five-year expiry date from the date of when you first purchase it.

References

Contactless smart cards
Fare collection systems in France
Transport in Lyon
2005 establishments in France